Kirovskyi District is an urban district of the city of Donetsk, Ukraine, named after a mayor of the Russian city Saint Petersburg Sergei Kirov.

Places

External links

 Kirov Raion at the Mayor of Donetsk website
 Kirov Raion at the Uzovka website

Urban districts of Donetsk